Sarah Marquis (born June 20, 1972) is a Swiss adventurer and explorer. From 2010 to 2013, she walked  alone from Siberia to the Gobi Desert, into China, Laos, Thailand, and then across Australia. In 2011, she gave a TED talk and in 2014 she was named one of National Geographics Adventurers of the Year.

Early life
Marquis was raised in Montsevelier, a village in the Canton of Jura in northern Switzerland. Her father worked as a watchmaker for Swatch and her mother was a housewife, and she had two brothers. She began exploring at a young age, and at sixteen years old she took up a job with a European train company so that she would be able to travel for free. At age seventeen she traveled to Turkey, where she rode a horse across the Central Anatolia Region.

Adventuring
Marquis cites a trip she took to New Zealand in her twenties as the first time she "actually got in touch with the wild": she spent a month in Kahurangi National Park without bringing any food. Her subsequent travels included canoeing through Algonquin Provincial Park in Canada, camping in Patagonia, and hiking the United States' Pacific Crest Trail. She hiked through the Andes of South America for eight months in 2006.
In 2006, she followed part of the Andes from Chile to Machu Picchu 7000 km for eight months. She received the help of a guide and her brother to place water caches along parts of her route. The guide revealed that she used a bike for 500 km  and the guide transported her by pick-up to the foot of a volcano. The TV show « Mise au point » of the Télévision suisse romande revealed Sarah Marquis didn't mention this in her book (La voie des Andes).

In 2010, Marquis began a three-year-long solo walk from Siberia through Asia and, traveling by boat from Thailand, across Australia. During this time, she maintained little human contact and pulled a  cart that contained her clothes, equipment and supplies. She was forced to evacuate her route in Mongolia in 2011 after developing a periodontal abscess, but returned to her exact location where she continued her journey. Along the route, she was harassed by a group of Mongolian men on horseback, threatened by Laotian drug dealers, and contracted dengue fever. For reasons of security, she sometimes disguised herself as a man and tried not to leave tracks so as not to be followed. She completed her journey in May 2013, when she arrived at a particular tree in the Nullarbor Plain that she had identified on her previous trip to Australia.

Marquis wrote a book, Sauvage par Nature ("Wild by nature"), in 2014. She was awarded one of the National Geographic Adventurers of the Year prizes for 2014.

In 2015, Marquis walked 500 miles across Kimberley in Western Australia where she passed three months and survived in the wilderness.

References

External links

1972 births
Female explorers
Swiss explorers
Swiss sportswomen
Swiss women writers
21st-century explorers
People from Delémont District
Living people